John Humphrey "Red" Davis (July 15, 1915 – April 26, 2002) was an American third baseman in Major League Baseball and a longtime manager in the minor leagues. Born in Wilkes-Barre, Pennsylvania, Davis threw and batted right-handed, stood 5'11" (180 cm) tall and weighed 172 pounds (78 kg).

Davis' major league career consisted of 21 games and 70 at bats during September 1941 as a member of the New York Giants. He collected 15 hits, with three doubles and five runs batted in, for a batting average of .214.

Davis made a more indelible imprint as a minor league skipper, logging 27 years (1949–72; 1974–76) in the farm systems of the Giants, Cincinnati Reds, Cleveland Indians and Pittsburgh Pirates, and working at all levels of the minors. He managed at Triple-A with the Minneapolis Millers, Phoenix/Tacoma Giants, Buffalo Bisons, Portland Beavers, Charleston Charlies and Oklahoma City 89ers. His teams won 1,993 games, losing 1,927 (.508) with four league championships.

He died in Laurel, Mississippi, at age 86.

References 

 Johnson, Lloyd, ed., The Minor League Register. Durham, North Carolina: Baseball America, 1994.

External links

 

1915 births
2002 deaths
American expatriate baseball people in the Dominican Republic
Baseball players from Pennsylvania
Buffalo Bisons (minor league) managers
Columbus Red Birds players
Corpus Christi Aces players
Dallas Eagles players
Dallas Rebels players
Daytona Beach Islanders players
Greensburg Red Wings players
Greenville Majors players
Houston Buffaloes players
Jersey City Giants players
Major League Baseball third basemen
Mayfield Clothiers players
Minneapolis Millers (baseball) managers
New York Giants (NL) players
Paris Indians players
Phoenix Giants players
Portland Beavers managers
San Antonio Missions players
Sportspeople from Wilkes-Barre, Pennsylvania